Shelf Awareness is an American publishing company that produces two electronic publications/newsletters focused on bookselling, books and book reviews.

Overview
With offices in Seattle, Washington, and Montclair, New Jersey, Shelf Awareness publishes an e-newsletter for the book industry and an e-newsletter for general readers.

Shelf Awareness Pro is a daily trade magazine for booksellers, publishers, librarians, and literary agents with a circulation of 39,000. Shelf Awareness for Readers is a twice-weekly (Tuesdays and Fridays) book review publication for consumers with a circulation of 399,000. Approximately 130 independent bookstores send out a version of Shelf Awareness for Readers to their customers.

History 

The company was founded by editor/journalist John Mutter (editor-in-chief) and Jenn Risko (publisher) in 2005 to produce a trade magazine for booksellers.

The circulation of Shelf Awareness Pro (also called Shelf Awareness for the Book Trade) is more than 39,000 industry professionals and is considered an essential trade publication for booksellers, publishers, librarians, and literary agents. The publication reports on independent bookstores, including openings, expansions, moves, staffing and closures; bookselling; publishing industry news, such as new titles, staffing, imprints, etc.; e-books and e-publication; authors; awards; media coverage of books and authors; and other features. Shelf Awareness Pro is often cited and/or sourced by other publications covering books and bookselling.

In 2011, Shelf Awareness launched a consumer book review version 
called Shelf Awareness for Readers. The company hired Marilyn Dahl as the review editor and Jennifer Brown as the children's literature editor. The consumer version, called Shelf Awareness for Readers (also known as Shelf Awareness: Enlightenment for Readers), has an approximate circulation of 399,000 readers. Key features include book reviews, author interviews, contests, and book-related news.

A version of Shelf Awareness for Readers is also sent out by approximately 130 independent bookstores to their customers. The "Bookstore Edition" includes the bookstore's events and the ability for readers to buy books reviewed directly from the store, as well as the bookstore's logo and other branding.

See also 

 New York Review of Books
 Kirkus Reviews
 Booklist
 Library Journal
 Publishers Weekly
 San Francisco Review of Books

References

External links 
 
 Malapros Bookstore, 
 Library Thing
 Richard Hugo House Kristen Steenbeeke, Hugo Blog, August 31, 2011

Book review magazines
English-language magazines
Literary magazines published in the United States
Magazines established in 2005
Magazines published in New Jersey
Magazines published in Seattle
Bookselling